Matilda Horn (born 16 August 1992) is a British coxswain. She won a silver medal in the eight at the 2019 European Rowing Championships.

References

External links

Matilda Horn at British Rowing

Living people
1992 births
British female rowers
Coxswains (rowing)
Rowers at the 2020 Summer Olympics